Anthony  'Awo'  Joseph Abrams (born 3 October 1979) is a Guyanese footballer who plays as a striker for Fruta Conquerors FC in the GFF Elite League. He previously played for Alpha United, Bakewell Topp XX and Slingerz FC; Caledonia AIA and Joe Public in the TT Pro League, and for Leo Victor in the Hoofdklasse where he finished as top scorer of the 2008–09 season with 22 goals. He is considered one of the best players in the history of Guyana, having amassed 61 caps for the national team.

Career
Abrams made his debut in the GFF Super League during the 2001–02 season at age 22 playing for Fruta Conquerors. In 2003, he transferred to Bakewell Topp XX where he played until 2005. In 2006, he signed with TT Pro League side Joe Public F.C. of Trinidad and Tobago, due to lack of opportunities however he returned to Guyana to play for Alpha United FC. In 2007, he returned to Trinidad and Tobago signing with Caledonia AIA only to return to Alpha United later that same year. In 2008, he moved to SV Leo Victor, playing in the Surinamese Hoofdklasse where he finished as the league top scorer with 22 goals. Returning to Alpha United, he made two appearances in 2011 in the club's CONCACAF Champions League campaign while scoring once, playing both matches against CS Herediano from Costa Rica.  In 2014, he transferred to Slingerz FC.

International career
Abrams made his debut for the Guyana national team on 15 February 2004 in a friendly match against Barbados. He scored his first goal for the national team against the same opponent on 13 February 2005 in a match which ended in a 3–3 draw. He was an instrumental part of the national teams FIFA World Cup qualifying campaigns in 2006, 2010 and in 2014, as well as having played in the Caribbean Cup.

Career statistics

International goals
Scores and results list Guyana's goal tally first.

Honors

Club
Alpha United FC
 GFF Super League (4): 2010, 2012, 2012–13, 2013–14
 GFF Super 8 Cup (1): 2010
 Georgetown Regional Cup (1): 2006
 NAMLICO Knock-out Tournament (1): 2010
 Kashif & Shanghai Cup: 2009–10 (runner-up)
 CFU Club Championship: 2011 (3rd place)

Caledonia AIA
 Trinidad and Tobago Cup: 2007 (runner-up)

Slingerz FC
 Guyana Mayors Cup (1): 2015

Individual
SVB Hoofdklasse Top Goalscorer: 2008–09

Personal life
He is the father of three children, Aaliyah De Freitas, Alicia Abrams and Romario Abrams.

References 

1979 births
Living people
Sportspeople from Georgetown, Guyana
Association football forwards
TT Pro League players
SVB Eerste Divisie players
S.V. Leo Victor players
Guyanese footballers
Guyana international footballers
Expatriate footballers in Suriname
Expatriate footballers in Trinidad and Tobago
Guyanese expatriate sportspeople in Suriname
Guyanese expatriate sportspeople in Trinidad and Tobago
Alpha United FC players
Slingerz FC players
Fruta Conquerors FC players
Topp XX FC players